The cricket team of Sui Northern Gas Pipelines Limited was a first-class cricket side that played in the Quaid-e-Azam Trophy, Patron's Trophy and Pentangular Trophy and also competed in Limited overs cricket. In May 2019, Pakistan's Prime Minister Imran Khan revamped the domestic cricket structure in Pakistan, excluding departmental teams in favour of regional sides, therefore ending the participation of the team. The Pakistan Cricket Board (PCB) was criticised in removing departmental sides, with players voicing their concern to revive the teams.

Honours
Mohammad Nissar Trophy
 2008 - Winner
Quaid-i-Azam Trophy
 2007-08 - Winner
 2017-18 - Winner
 2011-12 - Winner (Grade II)
 2014-15 - Winner
 2015-16 - Winner
President's Trophy
 2012-13 - Winner
 2013-14 - Winner
 2014-15 - Winner
 2015-16 - Winner
Pentangular Trophy
 2009-10 - Winner
National One-day Championship
 2007-08 - Winner
 2009-10 - Winner

Current squad 

 Players with international caps are listed in bold.

See also
 Pakistan Cricket Board
 Sui Northern Gas Pipelines Limited

References

External links
 CricketArchive

Pakistani first-class cricket teams